Serum may refer to:

Serum (blood), plasma from which the clotting proteins have been removed
Antiserum, blood serum with specific antibodies for passive immunity
Serous fluid, any clear bodily fluid
Truth serum, a drug that is likely to make people tell the truth
Gary Serum (born 1956), American baseball player
Serum, a software synthesizer VST created by Steve Duda

See also 
Sera (disambiguation)